Malankara Metropolitan is a  title formerly given to the head of the Malankara Church by the Government of Travancore and the Kingdom of Cochin in South India.

The Malankara Metropolitan is the head of the Malankara Church, the custodian of the Old Seminary, Kottayam and the Trustee for the Vattipanam (Trust Fund).
After 1877, various denominations in Malankara  began calling their prelate as Malankara Metropolitan. Among them the head of the Malankara Orthodox Syrian Church was affirmed by the Supreme court of India as the Malankara Metropolitan in the verdict pertaining to the asset dispute with the  Jacobite Syrian Christian Church. Baselios Marthoma Mathews III became Malankara Metropolitan in 2021.

After the Supreme court of India ruled in favour of the Malankara Orthodox Syrian Church and after the enactment of new bylaws for the Church in 2002, the Jacobite Syrian Christian Church uses the title "Metropolitan Trustee". As of 2022 the Metropolitan Trustee was Joseph Mor Gregorios.

The Mar Thoma Syrian Church primate of the church uses the title "Mar Thoma Metropolitan" since 1894. As of 2022 Mar Thoma Metropolitan was Theodosius Mar Thoma.

List of Malankara Methrans and Malankara Metropolitans of Malankara Church 
This is the list of Church heads of the Malankara Church after Coonan Cross Oath: 
Mar Thoma I (1653-1670). Four months after the Coonan Cross Oath, on 22 May 1653, Thoma Kathanar (Archdecon Thomas) of Pakalomatom Family was consecrated as Bishop with the title "Mar Thoma" by 12 priests. He is known as 'Mar Thoma I'  or 'Valiya Mar Thoma' (Mar Thoma the Great). The rival Catholic faction argued that consecration of Mar Thoma I by 12 priests was canonically irregular and so the Malankara church sent appeals to various Eastern Christian centers. Mor Gregorios Abdul Jaleel of Jerusalem reached Malankara in 1665 and regularized the ordination of Mar Thoma I, who had survived a number of assassination attempts. He died on 25 April 1670 and was interred at St Mary's Church, Angamaly.
Mar Thoma II (1670–1686). Consecrated by Mar Thoma I and Mor Gregorios Abdul Jaleel. Died on 14 April 1686 and was interred at St. Mary's Church, Niranam.
Mar Thoma III (1686–1688). Consecrated by Mar Ivanios Hirudyathulla (from Antioch). Died on 21 April 1688 and was interred at St. Thomas Church, Kadampanad.
Mar Thoma IV (1688–1728). Consecrated by Mar Ivanios Hirudyathulla. Died on 24 March 1728 and was interred at St. Mary's Church, Kandanad.
Mar Thoma V (1728–1765). Consecrated by Marthoma IV. Died on 8 May 1765 and was interred at St. Mary's Church, Niranam.
Mar Thoma VI (Mar Dionysius I) (1765–1808). Consecrated by Marthoma V. In June 1770, he accepted reconsecration from Antiochian bishops in order to avoid a split in the Church and the title Dionysius was accepted. Marthoma VI did not approve the appointment of  Kattumangattu Abraham Mar Coorilos as a metropolitan by a bishop from Antioch. This was the beginning of Malabar Independent Syrian Church.  Claudius Buchanan visited Mar Thoma VI and made arrangement for the translation of the Bible into Malayalam. Mar Thoma VI presented him the Peshitto Bible written in the old Syriac. This manuscript is kept in the public library of the University of Cambridge. Mar Thoma VI died on 8 April 1808 and was interred at St. Mary's Church, Puthencavu.
Mar Thoma VII (1808–1809) Consecrated by Marthoma VI in 1796. During his time on 1 December 1808, a sum of 3000 Star Pagoda (in 2002 one Star Pagoda coin had a market value of £475) was given as loan in perpetuity to the British resident Colonel Macaulay. This is known as Vattipanam. Marthoma VII died on 4 July 1809 and was interred at St. Peter and St. Paul's Church, Kolenchery.
Mar Thoma VIII (1809–1816). Consecrated on 2 July 1809 by Marthoma VII. During his time Kottayam Suriyani Seminary (later known as Pazhaya Seminary) was opened and modern education began in Kerala. Marthoma VIII died on 26 January 1816 and was interred at St. Mary's Church, Puthencavu
Mar Thoma IX (1816–1817). Consecrated by Marthoma VIII, he retired to his home parish St. George's Church, Kadamattom. He died in 1817 and was interred at Kadamattom Church. 
Mar Dionysius II (Pulikottil Joseph Mar Dionysius I) (1816-1816). Born as Joseph Ittoop in Pulikkottil family in Kunnamkulam in 1742 and was ordained as bishop with title Joseph Mar Dionysius by Kidangan Geevarghese Mar Philexenos of Thozhiyur Church on 22 March 1815. After the death of Mar Thoma VIII, who ordained his uncle Iype Kathanar as Mar Thoma IX was forced to abdicate his position and hand over charge to Joseph Mar Dionysius as he was made the supreme head of the Malankara Church by a Royal proclamation issued by the ruler of Travancore and later by the ruler of Cochin. From the time of Joseph Mar Dionysius, the title of Malankara Church head is known as Malankara Metropolitan. As he was the second Bishop with the name Dionysius in Malankara Church, he is also known as Mar Dionysius II. He died on 24 November 1816 and was interred at Pazhaya Seminary, Kottayam
Mar Dionysius III (Punnathra Mar Dionysius) (1817–1825). Born as Kurien in Punnathara family in Kottayam in 1785 and ordained as bishop by Kidangan Geevarghese Mar Philexenos of Thozhiyur Church on 19 October 1817. He was pressurised by Angilican missionaries who wanted to reform the Malankara Church. He had to appoint a six-member committee to suggest improvements to be made in the church. He died on 17 May 1825 and was interred at St. Mary's Cheriapally, Kottayam
Mar Dionysius IV (Cheppattu Philipose Mar Dionysius) (1825–1852). Born as Philipose in Aanjilimootil family in Pallippad near Cheppad in 1781 and was consecrated by Kidangan Geevarghese Mar Philexenos of Thozhiyur Church on 27 August 1825. He had to face many obstacles during his reign. The C.M.S missionaries who came from England and their and the Anglican bishop of Calcutta began to interfere in the internal affairs of the Malankara Church. A letter from the bishop of Calcutta in 1835 suggested some changes in administration and liturgical practices of Malankara Church. Dionysius IV convened a meeting of the representatives of the parishes at Mavelikara on 16 January 1836 and  rejected the suggestions of the Anglican Bishop. The meeting at Mavelikara gave official recognition to the Patriarch of Antioch as the Supremacy Administration of the Malankara Church. Hence, it was at this time Malankara Church came to be referred to as Jacobite Church. Soon the C.M.S. missionaries formed the C.M.S. Church and a minority of Malankara Church members joined in C.M.S. Church. Even after Malankara Church ended its relationship with C.M.S. missionaries, the teaching of the missionaries influenced a group of church members. Some clergies under the leadership of Palakkunnath Abraham Malpan urged for a reformation in the Church.  Abraham Malpan send his nephew Palakunnathu Deacon Mathews to Antioch without the permission of the Malankara Church and the Malankara Metropolitan. He was consecrated as bishop with the title Mathews Mar Athanasius by Patriarch of Antioch, Ignatius Elias II on 17 February 1842. He was the first bishop in Malankara ordained by Patriarch of Antioch. After about a year, in March 1843 Athanasius returned to India. There were objections from among the Malankara Church. They later wrote to Antioch their objections and hence in 1846 the Patriarch of Antioch sent a Metropolitan Mor Kurilos Yuyakkim to Malankara as his delegate.  In 1852 Dionysius IV abdicated due to poor health. Both Mor Kurilos Yuyakkim and Mathews Mar Athanasius made the claims for the Malankara Metropolitan title. The King of Travancore appointed a committee of four senior government officers and  they decided that a foreign bishop could not be regarded as the Malankara Metropolitan. So the king issued a proclamation in favour of Mathews Mar Athanasius on 30 August 1852.  After abdicating, Dionysius IV was bedridden due to ill health and died on 9 October 1855 and was interred at St. George Church, Cheppad
Mathews Mar Athanasius (1852–1877). During the reign of Mathews Mar Athanasius reformation of the Church gained a momentum. However, the large majority of the people were traditionalist and the reformist party was a small minority. Traditionalist party sent Fr.Joseph (Ouseph Kathanar) of Pulikkottil family to Antioch. He was the nephew of Pulikkottil Joseph Mar Dionysious I (Mar Dionysius II). He was consecrated as Joseph Mar Dionysius II (Mar Dionysius V) by Patriarch of Antioch Ignatius Yakoob II on 7 May 1865. After reaching Malankara, Mar Dionysius V had requested to the Government of Travancore, for revoking the Royal Proclamation, issued earlier in favour of Mathews Mar Athanasius. But this appeal was rejected by Government and asked Mar Dionysius V to approach the Royal Court. Mathews Mar Athanasius consecrated elder son of Abraham Malpan with title Thomas Mar Athanasius as his successor in 1869. Mathews Mar Athanasius died on 16 July 1877 and was interred at Maramon Church. Litigation between traditionalist and reformist group continued and on 12 July 1889 Thomas Mar Athanasius was removed from the office by Royal Court and declared Mar Dionysius V (Pulikkottil Joseph Mar Dionysious II) as the rightful Malankara Metropolitan

List of Malankara Metropolitans of Malankara Church after 1865 following the deposition of Mathews Mar Athanasius 
Mar Dionysius V (Pulikkottil Joseph Mar Dionysius II) (1865-1909)
Dionysius VI (1909–1934)
Geevarghese II (1934–1964) From 1934 Malankara Metropolitan also held the office of Catholicos of the East of the Malankara Orthodox Syrian Church.
Augen I (1964–1975), also Catholicos of the East
Mathews I (1975–1991), also Catholicos of the East
Mathews II (1991–2005),[46] also Catholicos of the East
Didymos I (2005–2010), also Catholicos of the East
Paulose II (2010–2021), also Catholicos of the East
Mathews III (15th Oct 2021–Present), also Catholicos of the East

References

History of Christianity in India
Lists of Christian religious leaders
Saint Thomas Christians
Malankara Orthodox Syrian Church bishops
Oriental Orthodox bishops
Malankara Metropolitans
Malankara Orthodox Syrian Church
Malankara Orthodox Syrian Church saints
Catholicoi of the East and Malankara Metropolitans